Balde is a genus of tachinid flies in the family Tachinidae.

Species
Balde striatum Rice, 2005

Distribution
Tasmania.

References

Exoristinae
Diptera of Australasia
Tachinidae genera
Monotypic Brachycera genera